Chittar may refer to:

 Chittar, Kerala, a village in Kerala
 Chittar, Tamil Nadu, a village in Tamil Nadu
 Chittar River, a river in Tamil Nadu